Naji Talib  (1 July  1917 – 23 March 2012) was the prime minister of Iraq from 1966 to 1967, replacing Abd ar-Rahman al-Bazzaz.

Early life 
Talib was born in 1917 in Nasiriyah, Iraq. His family were from the landowning class in Iraq; his father was a landowner in and mayor of Nasiriyah and a member of parliament.

Military career
Talib was educated at the British Military Academy from 1936 to 1939. During 1954 and 1955 he was stationed in London as a military attaché, In 1958 Naji Talib's rank and post was that of Staff brigadier, commander, 15th Infantry Brigade, 1st Division, Basrah, and upon retirement from the army he had reached the rank of Major General.

Political career

In 1956  Staff Colonel Naji Talib was the commandant of the Senior Officers School in Baghdad. During this year he proposed the immediate union of Iraq with the United Arab Republic upon an antagonistic intervention by any of the parties to the Baghdad Pact, The Supreme committee committed itself unanimously to the proposal. In 1957 Naji Talib became the second deputy chairman of the Free Officers Movement in Iraq.
Naji Talib's role in government included taking up the positions of Minister of Social Affairs 14 July 1958 – 7 February 1959, Minister of Industries 1963, Minister of Foreign Affairs 1964–1965, and finally Prime Minister 9 August 1966 – 9 May 1967.
Naji Talib later became a middle-of-the-roader after holding ministerial portfolios under Qasim and in the days of the Ba'th. While politically he wavered between an independent nationalist attitude and Nasserism, he had succeeded in remaining in all the good graces of all the contending military factions.

Later activities
On 7 November 2004 a proposal was sent to then Secretary General of the United Nations, Kofi Annan, to form an Iraqi committee initiative on Falluja. The proposal stated that Naji Talib was willing to become a member of an initiative which planned to start a series of visits to the town of Falluja, to conduct meetings with its inhabitants, combatants, and official police there to find a just solution to safeguard the town and its people from harm as well save the lives of occupation troops.

On 22 October 2005 Talib was acting as a negotiator for the Sunnis in Iraq.

References

 

Nasserists
Prime Ministers of Iraq
1917 births
2012 deaths
Iraqi Shia Muslims
Government ministers of Iraq
Iraqi Arab nationalists
Iraqi expatriates in the United Kingdom
Iraqi Military Academy alumni